Infidelity is the act of unfaithfulness towards a romantic partner.

Infidelity may also refer to:

 Infidelity (1917 film), a lost American silent film
 Infidelity (1987 film), an American made-for-television film
 In Olden Days, a 1952 Italian anthology film also known as Infidelity

See also 

 Fidelity (disambiguation)

 Cheating (disambiguation)
 Adultery (disambiguation)
 Unfaithful (disambiguation)
 Affair (disambiguation)